Arthur Kennedy (19141990) was an American film actor.

Arthur Kennedy may also refer to:
 Sir Arthur Kennedy (colonial administrator) (1809–1883), British colonial administrator
 Arthur Leo Kennedy (born 1942), American Roman Catholic cleric who was auxiliary bishop in Boston, Massachusetts
 Arthur Kennedy (football manager), manager of Arsenal F.C. in 1899
 Arthur Clark Kennedy (1857–1926), English poet
 Arthur Garfield Kennedy (1880–1954), American philologist

See also
 Kennedy (disambiguation)
 Arthur (disambiguation)